The 215 Azam Corps is one of the eight corps of the Islamic Emirate Army established in October 2021 and headquartered in Helmand. The current Chief of Staff is Maulvi Abdul Aziz "Ansari". The Islamic Republic of Afghanistan-era corps it replaced was known as the 215th 'Maiwand' Corps and was a part of Afghan National Army.

Command Staff

215th 'Maiwand' Corps  

The 215th 'Maiwand' Corps was one of the Corps of the Afghan National Army. Its headquarters was at Lashkargah, Helmand province. The Corps was established in 2009 and had strength of around 18,000 soldiers in 2015. The Corps was responsible for the security of south-western part of Afghanistan (Helmand province and Nimruz province). In 2015, the Corps was described as one of the weakest Corps among the six Afghan National Army Corps. One of the reasons cited for the 215th Corps weak performance compared to other corps was the inexperience of the corps commander.

General Sami Sadat was appointed as the commander of the Corps in late November/December 2020. He commanded the Corps during the 2021 Taliban offensive and was later appointed as the commander of Afghan National Army Special Operations Command (ANASOC) on 11 August. No one is reported to have been appointed as the commander of the 215th Corps after Sadat's transfer and the Corps eventually surrendered in Battle of Lashkargah on 13 August 2021.

Formations 
Under the Islamic Republic from 2010-2015, its subordinate formations included:
 1st Brigade and Headquarters at Camp Garmsir (very close to Camp Dwyer)
 Commanded by Brigadier General Mohammad Shujaee during 2011
 2nd Brigade at Sangin
 3rd Brigade at Camp Shorabak
 4th Brigade at FOB Delaram
 215th Engineering Kandak

Former commanders of 215th Corps 
 General Sayed Mallok (or Malouk) (2010-2014)
 Brigadier General Dadan Lawang (2014-)
 Brigadier General Wali Mohammad Ahmadzai (2017)
 General Sami Sadat (July-August 2021)

References 

Corps of Afghanistan
Military units and formations established in 2010
Corps of the Islamic Emirate Army